The 78th season of the Campeonato Gaúcho kicked off on February 1, 1998 and ended on June 7, 1998. Twenty-eight teams participated. Juventude beat Internacional in the finals and won their 1st title, being the first team from outside Porto Alegre to win the title since 1939. That championship also marked the first time since 1954 that neither Grêmio or Internacional won the title. Farroupilha and Guarany de Garibaldi were relegated.

Participating teams

System 
The championship would have four stages:

 Division A: Comprised fourteen teams. Grêmio, Internacional and Juventude earned a bye directly to the Second phase. The remaining eleven teams played each other in a single round-robin system. The six best teams qualified to the Second phase, while the bottom two teams would have to dispute the Copa Abílio dos Reis in the Second semester. São Luiz, Inter de Santa Maria, Brasil de Pelotas and Glória, due to their performance in the 1997 Copa Galego, were automatically qualified regardless of placing.
 Division B: The twelve teams that had qualified to Division B in the previous year joined the two teams that had been promoted from the Second level, and were divided into two groups of seven, in which each team played the teams of its own group in a double round-robin system. the best two teams in each group, plus the best third-placed team qualified to the Second phase, while the bottom-placed team in each group was relegated to the Second level. The teams that finished from the second to sixth place could participate in the Copa Abílio dos Reis.
 Second phase: The sixteen remaining teams were divided into four groups of four, in which each team played the teams of its own group in a double round-robin system. The two best teams in each group qualified to the Quarterfinals.
 Final rounds: The remaining eight teams played a series of two-legged knockout ties to define the champions.

Championship

Division A

Division B

Group 1

Group 2

Second phase

Group 1

Group 2

Group 3

Group 4

Quarterfinals

Semifinals 

|}

Finals 

|}

State Cups 

For the second semester, Two tournaments were held; the Copa Ênio Andrade, disputed by five teams from Division A, and the Copa Abílio dos Reis, disputed by seven teams from Division B and the bottom two from Division A.

In the Copa Ênio Andrade, all teams played each other in a double round-robin system, with the two best teams earning an automatic qualification, and an extra point, to the Second phase of the 1999 championship. The winner also won a berth in the 1999 Copa Sul.

In the Copa Abílio dos Reis, all teams played each other in a double round-robin system, with the four best teams qualifying for the Division A of the 1999 championship.

Copa Ênio Andrade

Playoffs 

|}

Copa Abílio dos Reis

Playoffs 

|}

References 

Campeonato Gaúcho seasons
Gaúcho